Liu Boming (1887–1923) was a Chinese educator and philosopher born in the late Qing Dynasty.

Liu Boming is the first Chinese who received a doctor's degree in philosophy.
He finished his work The Theory of Chinese Mind Nature in 1913, and The Philosophy of Taoism in 1915 when he was a Doctoral candidate at Northwestern University in the United States.
He introduced western philosophy to China when he was a professor of Nanjing University. Under his influence, the scholars of Xueheng School translated a number of books of classic Greek philosophy into Chinese.

1923 deaths
1887 births
Educators from Nanjing
Academic staff of the University of Nanking
Academic staff of Nanjing University
Writers from Nanjing
Northwestern University alumni